Congolese records in athletics may refer to:
 List of Democratic Republic of the Congo records in athletics
 List of Republic of the Congo records in athletics